Micaela Belén Suárez (born 28 January 2000) is an Argentine badminton player. She was the mixed doubles champion at the 2016 Argentina International partnered with Mateo Delmastro.

Achievements

BWF International Challenge/Series 
Mixed doubles

  BWF International Challenge tournament
  BWF International Series tournament
  BWF Future Series tournament

References

External links 
 

Living people
2000 births
People from Neuquén
Argentine female badminton players